Asifabad may refer to:
Asifabad, Telangana, a town and the headquarters of Komaram Bheem district, Telangana, India
Asifabad (Assembly constituency), constituency of Telangana Legislative Assembly, India
Asefabad, Kurdistan, also known as Āsifābād, a village in Kurdistan Province, Iran